The 1954 Northwestern Wildcats team represented Northwestern University during the 1954 Big Ten Conference football season. In their eighth year under head coach Bob Voigts, the Wildcats compiled a 2–7 record (1-5 against Big Ten Conference opponents), finished in a tie for eighth place in the Big Ten, and were outscored by their opponents by a combined total of 142 to 101.

Schedule

References

Northwestern
Northwestern Wildcats football seasons
Northwestern Wildcats football